Czaple  is a village in the administrative district of Gmina Żukowo, within Kartuzy County, Pomeranian Voivodeship, in northern Poland. It is located within the historic region of Pomerania.

The village has a population of 190.

Czaple was a royal village of the Polish Crown, administratively located in the Gdańsk County in the Pomeranian Voivodeship.

References

Czaple